Aušra Gudeliūnaitė (born 5 September 1963) is a Lithuanian rowing coxswain. She competed in the women's eight event at the 1988 Summer Olympics.

References

1963 births
Living people
Lithuanian female rowers
Olympic rowers of the Soviet Union
Rowers at the 1988 Summer Olympics
Sportspeople from Vilnius
Coxswains (rowing)